The Baía de São José is a bay of the Atlantic Ocean in the state of Maranhão in northeastern Brazil.

The bay is an estuary which receives several rivers, including the Itapecuru and Munim.

São Luís Island, also known as Maranhão Island or Upaon-açu Island, separates the Baía de São José from the Baía de São Marcos just to the west. São Luís Island is home to São Luís, Maranhão's capital.

References 

Estuaries of Brazil
Landforms of Maranhão
Bays of Brazil